Holasteroida is an order of irregular sea urchins.

Characteristics 

These irregular sea urchins are characterized by a particularly marked bilateral symmetry, including for the apical system, which is highly elongated. In some contemporary abyssal groups such as Pourtalesiidae, some species are even bottle-shaped. The mouth (peristome) does not contain an Aristotle's lantern. The anus (periproct) has migrated towards the periphery of the test. The plastron is never amphisternous.

This order seems to have appeared at the lower Cretaceous.

List of families 
According to World Register of Marine Species : 
 Family Hemipneustidae (Lambert, 1917) †
 genus Hemipneustes L. Agassiz, 1835 †
 genus Medjesia Jeffery, 1997 †
 genus Opisopneustes Gauthier, 1889 †
 genus Plesiohemipneustes Smith & Wright, 2003 †
 genus Toxopatagus Pomel, 1883 †
 Sub-order Meridosternata (Lovén, 1883)
 Infra-order Cardiasterina †
 Family Cardiasteridae Lambert, 1917 †
 Family Stegasteridae Lambert, 1917f †
 Family Echinocorythidae Wright, 1857 †
 Family Holasteridae Pictet, 1857 †
 Genus Salvaster Saucède, Dudicourt & Courville, 2012 †
 Infra-order Urechinina
 Family Calymnidae Mortensen, 1907
 Family Carnarechinidae Mironov, 1993
 Family Corystusidae Foster & Philip, 1978
 Family Plexechinidae Mooi & David, 1996
 Family Pourtalesiidae A. Agassiz, 1881
 Family Urechinidae Duncan, 1889
 Family Pseudholasteridae (Smith & Jeffery, 2000) †
 genus Eoholaster Solovjev, 1989 †
 genus Giraliaster Foster & Philip, 1978 †
 genus Pseudholaster Pomel, 1883 †
 genus Taphraster Pomel, 1883 †
 Family Stenonasteridae (Lambert, 1922) †
 genus Stenonaster Lambert, 1922 †

References

 Holasteroida at the Natural History Museum